Douglas John Risebrough (born January 29, 1954) is a Canadian former player, coach, and general manager in the National Hockey League. In his 31 years in the NHL, he has been involved with the Stanley Cup Playoffs 25 times. He is currently a pro scout for the New York Rangers.

Playing history 
Risebrough was born in Guelph, Ontario, and was the Montreal Canadiens’ first pick (7th overall) in the 1974 NHL amateur draft. In eight seasons with the Canadiens, Risebrough helped Montreal capture four consecutive Stanley Cup titles (1976 through 1979). He was traded to the Calgary Flames on September 11, 1982, and spent the next five years with the Flames. During his tenure with Calgary, Risebrough skated as the Flames co-captain then tri-captain for four seasons, with both Lanny McDonald and Jim Peplinski. In 1986, as a Tri-Captain, Doug Risebrough led the Flames to his fifth Stanley Cup Finals as a player. They eventually lost to the Montreal Canadiens.

Throughout his career, Risebrough was an agitator, often assigned to pester the opponents' top players. In one famous chapter of the Battle of Alberta, Risebrough, while playing with the Flames fought with Marty McSorley. Risebrough lost the fight, but ended up with McSorley's jersey, which he shredded with his skates.

In 740 career NHL games, Risebrough totaled 185 goals and 471 points. He added 21 goals and 37 assists in 124 Stanley Cup playoff contests. He also held a total of 1542 penalty minutes during the regular season, and an additional 238 in the playoffs. During his 13-year career, teams on which Risebrough played recorded a .660 regular season winning percentage (607–274–159).

Coaching and management history 
After announcing his retirement as a player following the 1986–87 season, Risebrough served two seasons as an assistant coach with the Flames. He helped guide Calgary to two consecutive Presidents' Trophies and the 1989 Stanley Cup championship, his fifth Stanley Cup championship as a player or coach. He was promoted to assistant general manager for the Flames before the 1989–90 season, and served as Calgary’s head coach for the 1990–91 campaign. On May 16, 1991, Risebrough became only the second general manager in Flames’ history, and served as both general manager and coach for the first 64 games of the 1991–92 season. On March 1, 1992, Risebrough's Flames were beaten by the Vancouver Canucks 11–0. Immediately after the game, Risebrough relinquished his coaching duties to assistant Guy Charron. He did however continue his role as Calgary's general manager until November 2, 1995.

Prior to joining the Minnesota Wild, Risebrough served as the Edmonton Oilers vice president of hockey operations from 1996 to 1999. With the Oilers he was involved in all aspects of the club's hockey operations department. Edmonton advanced to the Stanley Cup playoffs in each of the three seasons Risebrough was with the organization. The turnaround followed four consecutive years in which the Oilers did not make the playoffs.

Risebrough was named executive vice president and general manager of the Minnesota Wild on September 2, 1999.  After the Wild's first playoff appearance in 2002–03, he was promoted to president of Minnesota Sports and Entertainment, the corporate parent of the Wild, on July 23, 2003. On April 16, 2009, Risebrough was relieved of his duties with the Minnesota Wild.

Career statistics

Coaching record

Personal life 
Risebrough and his wife Marilyn have two daughters, Allison and Lindsay, who was a star tennis player at Edina High School and the University of Minnesota.

References

External links 
Hockey Draft Central profile

Note: Risebrough and McDonald were co-captains during the 1983–84 season. Risebrough, McDonald and Peplinski were tri-captains during 1984–87 seasons.

1954 births
Calgary Flames captains
Calgary Flames coaches
Calgary Flames general managers
Calgary Flames players
Cleveland Crusaders draft picks
Edmonton Oilers executives
Ice hockey people from Ontario
Kitchener Rangers players
Living people
Minnesota Wild executives
Minnesota Wild general managers
Montreal Canadiens draft picks
Montreal Canadiens players
National Hockey League first-round draft picks
National Hockey League general managers
New York Rangers scouts
Nova Scotia Voyageurs players
Stanley Cup champions
Sportspeople from Guelph
Canadian ice hockey centres
Canadian ice hockey coaches